General Boy is a character created around 1975 by new wave band Devo. He is usually seen portrayed by Robert Mothersbaugh, Sr., the father of Devo's lead singer Mark Mothersbaugh, former drummer Jim Mothersbaugh, and lead guitarist Bob Mothersbaugh.

History
General Boy, along with his son Booji Boy, were first introduced in the 1976 short film The Truth About De-Evolution.  Both characters have made numerous appearances in various short films, music videos, written propaganda and even concerts by the band.

Both characters were also incorporated into Devo's 1996 PC CD-ROM video game Devo Presents Adventures of the Smart Patrol (with Booji Boy being re-christened "Boogie Boy").  The booklet of the game claims that the Boys' true last name was Rothwell and that Booji Boy's true name was Craig Allen Rothwell.

The game's booklet also contained more information about General Boy's back story:

For reasons unknown, General Boy was portrayed by actor Tom Finnegan in the game (it is likely that this was because Robert was not available). Robert Mothersbaugh, Sr. reprised his role as General Boy at the annual 2002 DEVOtional event held in Cleveland, Ohio.

Under the General Boy pseudonym, Robert Mothersbaugh, Sr. is credited as a co-writer on "Enough Said", the closing track of Devo's 1981 album New Traditionalists.

Robert Mothersbaugh, Sr. died in 2016.

References

External links
 Devo's Official Website
 Booji Boy's Basement
 General Boy intro for Devo "Beautiful World" from YouTube

Devo
Fictional characters introduced in 1975
Music mascots
Mascots introduced in 1975
Fictional characters invented for recorded music
Fictional military personnel